Terraserver may refers to either of two databases for viewing geospatial imagery:
 Terraserver.com, a commercial web site
 TerraServer-USA, which hosts public domain United States Geological Survey aerial images on Microsoft servers